This is a list of radio stations that broadcast on FM frequency 108.0 MHz:

Afghanistan
 108.0 Kabul Rock

Egypt
 108.0 MHz Goal FM  (Cairo)

Greece
 Ihorama FM

Indonesia
 Jalasveva Jayamahe (JJM): Jakarta

Italy
 Radio Gioiosa Marina (Gioiosa Marina)
 Radio Studio Emme (Napoli)

Spain
 108.0 Vibe FM Alicante

References 

Lists of radio stations by frequency